Nimeh Kar or Nimehkar may refer to:
 Nimeh Kar, Khamir, Hormozgan Province
 Nimeh Kar, Rudan, Hormozgan Province
 Nimeh Kar, Kermanshah